Sujalaam Skycity, popularly known as Andal Aerotropolis is India's first aerotropolis, located at Andal, between the industrial cities of Durgapur and Asansol in the Paschim Bardhaman district of West Bengal. It is also the first greenfield aerotropolis, developed around the Kazi Nazrul Islam Airport. It has been developed in association with Singapore's Changi Airports International (CAI) and constructed by Bengal Aerotropolis Projects Limited (BAPL). The airport city is constructed around an old airfield RAF Station Andal and used by the RAF in Andal, and also by the USAAF during World War II.

Formation
On 7 September 2007, the Union Civil Aviation Ministry and the West Bengal government announced plans to set up a new airport – along with a township, IT and logistics hub – at Durgapur subdivision.
Bestowed with premium facilities and unparalleled opportunities in the fields of power-intensive industries, mining, iron and steel, metalwork, engineering, petrochemicals, Information Technology (IT) and telecommunications, ADPA had proved to be an ideal destination for investors. BAPL completed most of its legal procedures, receiving the In-Principal Clearance from the Ministry of Civil Aviation as well as getting the Land Use Development Control Plan (LUDCP) approved by Asansol Durgapur Development Authority (ADDA). It entered into a Technical Services Agreement with Changi Airports India Pte Ltd, Singapore.
 In the area both Burnpur and Durgapur have airstrips for the landing of small planes. The airfield at Panagarh is under Indian Air Force.

The city
Andal Aerotropolis has 493 acre of integrated Township, 472 acres of IT Park, logistics hub and industrial area and 258 acres of institutional area. Narayana Schools have an operating school on the premises. Moreover a logistics hub of Spectrum Logistics has been set up and is operational (used by Asian Paints). Another company Ardex Endura, which is a ceramic factory, have their operations in the aerotropolis. Keventer Agro has one of its operational unit in the Sujalaam Skycity. Fortune group of hotels has announced its intention to start a four-star hotel like the one in City Centre. Mission hospital is also set to construct its unit there. Lemon tree Hotels have agreed to set up an 80 roomed mid priced luxury hotel in the Sujalaam Skycity.

See also
 West Bengal
 List of airports in West Bengal

References

External links
 Official project page
 http://durgapurmycity.blogspot.com/2009/06/pictures-of-durgapur-aerotropolis.html

Airports in West Bengal
Transport in Asansol
Transport in Durgapur
Proposed infrastructure in West Bengal